Jenny Johansson (born January 19, 1977) is a Swedish orienteering competitor. She is Relay World Champion as a member of the Swedish winning team in 2004, as well as having silver medals from 2001, 2003 and 2006, and bronze medal from 2005. She obtained silver in the Short distance World Championship in 2001 and Middle distance in 2005, and bronze in the Sprint distance in 2003.

She has two World Cup victories, one from 2000 and one 2005, in addition to several second places. She won gold medal in the 2000 European Orienteering Championships, Short distance, and also Relay gold medal in 2004.

References

External links

1977 births
Living people
Swedish orienteers
Female orienteers
Foot orienteers
World Orienteering Championships medalists
Competitors at the 2001 World Games
World Games bronze medalists
World Games medalists in orienteering
Junior World Orienteering Championships medalists